Achwa Hydroelectric Power Station may refer to one of the following:

 Achwa 1 Hydroelectric Power Station, a planned 41 megawatts hydroelectric power station across the Achwa River in Uganda
 Achwa 2 Hydroelectric Power Station, a 42 megawatts hydroelectric power station under construction across Achwa River in Uganda 
 Achwa 3 Hydroelectric Power Station, a planned 10 megawatts hydroelectric power station across Achwa River in Uganda.